Yerulan Askakovich Iskakov (Russian: Ерулан Аскарович Искаков: born 24 June 1988) is a heavyweight Greco-Roman wrestler from Kazakhstan. He won bronze medals at the 2014 and 2018 Asian Games and 2017 and 2018 Asian championships. He won the Asian championships in 2014.

In 2019, he competed in the 97 kg event at the 2019 World Wrestling Championships held in Nur-Sultan, Kazakhstan.

References

1988 births
Living people
Kazakhstani male sport wrestlers
Wrestlers at the 2014 Asian Games
Wrestlers at the 2018 Asian Games
Medalists at the 2014 Asian Games
Medalists at the 2018 Asian Games
Asian Games medalists in wrestling
Asian Games bronze medalists for Kazakhstan
Asian Wrestling Championships medalists
21st-century Kazakhstani people